Silvia Bosurgi (born 17 April 1979 in Messina) is a water polo forward from Italy, who won the gold medal with the Women's National Team at the 2004 Summer Olympics in Athens, Greece.

She participated at the 2001 World Aquatics Championships, 2003 World Aquatics Championships, and 2009 World Aquatics Championships.

See also
 Italy women's Olympic water polo team records and statistics
 List of Olympic champions in women's water polo
 List of Olympic medalists in water polo (women)
 List of world champions in women's water polo
 List of World Aquatics Championships medalists in water polo

References

External links
 

1979 births
Living people
Sportspeople from Messina
Italian female water polo players
Water polo drivers
Water polo players at the 2004 Summer Olympics
Water polo players at the 2008 Summer Olympics
Medalists at the 2004 Summer Olympics
Olympic gold medalists for Italy in water polo
World Aquatics Championships medalists in water polo